Die Verbannten Kinder Evas is an Austrian darkwave music project founded in 1993 by Richard Lederer and Michael Gregor, signed to Napalm Records.

Biography 
The band originally consisted of Protector and Silenius, members of the black metal band Summoning. Michael Gregor later left the band to focus on Summoning. The music is slow and melancholic, with clear female and male vocals, and with lyrics inspired by John Dowland and Percy Bysshe Shelley. In 2006 the band released their fourth album, Dusk and Void Became Alive, featuring a new lead singer, Christina Kroustali.

"Die Verbannten Kinder Evas" means "The Banished Children of Eve", from the hymn Salve Regina.

Discography 
1995: Die Verbannten Kinder Evas
1997: Come Heavy Sleep
1999: In Darkness Let Me Dwell
2006: Dusk and Void Became Alive

Line-up 
Current line-up
 Richard Lederer — synthesizer and vocals
 Christina Kroustali (Lady of Carnage) — vocals

Former members
 Michael Gregor — synthesizer and vocals
 Julia Lederer — vocals
 Tania Borsky — vocals

References

External links 
 

Austrian dark wave musical groups
Musical groups established in 1993
Neoclassical dark wave musical groups
Napalm Records artists